The UAE President's Handball Cup is a professional Handball tournament that takes place in the United Arab Emirates. Founded in 1977, the inaugural champion was Al Wasl, although Al-Sharjah has taken the trophy the most times of any club, prevailing 10 times.

Champions

Performance by club

List of champions
Source:

1977–78: Al-Wasl
1978–79: Al-Wasl
1979–80: Al-Ain
1980–81: Al-Sharjah
1981–82: Al-Ain
1982–83: Al-Wasl
1983–84: Al-Wasl
1984–85: Al-Wasl
1985–86: Al-Sharjah
1986–87: Al-Ahli
1987–88: Al-Shabab
1988–89: Al-Ain
1989–90: Al-Ahli
1990–91: Al Jazira
1991–92: Al-Sharjah
1992–93: Al-Wasl
1993–94: Al-Shabab
1994–95: Al Jazira
1995–96: Al-Sharjah
1996–97: Al-Shabab
1997–98: Al Jazira
1998–99: Al-Nasr Dubai SC
1999–00: Al-Ahli
2000–01: Al-Shabab
2001–02: Al-Shabab
2002–03: Al-Ahli
2003–04: Al-Nasr Dubai SC
2004–05: Al-Ain
2005-06: Al-Ain
2006-07: Al-Wasl
2007-08: Al-Sharjah
2008–09: Al-Sharjah
2009–10: Al-Shabab
2010–11: Al Jazira
2011–12: Al-Ahli
2012–13: Al-Nasr Dubai SC
2013–14: Al Jazira
2014–15: Al-Nasr Dubai SC
2015–16: Al Jazira
2016–17: Al-Ahli
2017–18: Al-Ahli
2018–19: Al-Sharjah
2019–20: Al-Sharjah
2020–21: Al-Sharjah
2021–22: Al-Sharjah

References

Handball competitions in the United Arab Emirates
Recurring sporting events established in 1977
1977 establishments in the United Arab Emirates